Frank Morse may refer to:
F. Bradford Morse (1921–1994), U.S. congressman from Massachusetts
Frank Morse (California attorney), California businessman and attorney
Frank Morse (Oregon politician), member of the Oregon State Senate
Frank Morse (rugby league), New Zealand rugby league player
Frank C. Morse (1859–?), Washington state pioneer and state official
Frank Morse (architect), Boston-based marine architect, see Ladies Delight Light